Dyrdal Peak is a peak,  high, standing at the southwestern extremity of Saratoga Table,  west-northwest of Fierle Peak, in the Forrestal Range of the Pensacola Mountains of Antarctica. It was mapped by the United States Geological Survey from surveys and from U.S. Navy air photos, 1956–66, and was named by the Advisory Committee on Antarctic Names for Frederick F. Dyrdal, an aviation structural mechanic at Ellsworth Station, winter 1957.

See also
 Mountains in Antarctica

References 

Mountains of Ellsworth Land